The Kerala Forest Research Institute (KFRI) is an organisation based in Peechi, in Thrissur, India. It was established in 1975 by the Government of Kerala as part of its Science and Technology Department, and in 2003 became part of the Kerala State Council for Science, Technology and Environment.

The institute carries out research, training and extension on a range of disciplines related to tropical forests and forestry. Besides its main campus at Peechi in Thrissur District, a sub-centre has been established at Nilambur and a field research centre at Palapilly, in the Thrissur district. The main campus situated on the Thrissur-Peechi road has the main administrative offices, research divisions, laboratories, nurseries, greenhouses, museums, guest houses and the Kerala Forest Seed Centre. The sub-centre at Nilambur has the Teak Museum and the Bio-resources Nature Trail that attracts many visitors. The field research center has the "Bambusetum" with a collection of 65 species of tropical bamboo, an arboretum and the Bamboo Primary Processing Centre.

The institute also hosts the following international/national offices:
 Teaknet – the International Teak Information Network supported by the FAO, Rome
 Bamboo Technical Support Group supported by National Bamboo Mission, New Delhi
 Journal of Bamboo and Rattan
 Bamboo Information Centre – India

In August 2019, a group of scientists of the Kerala Forest Research Institute (KFRI) collaborated with Ghent University, Belgium, to study the consequences of climate change on different ecosystems, especially mangroves on the coastal areas of the State.

See also
Protected areas of Kerala
Teak Museum
Wildlife of Kerala
List of Kerala State Government Organizations
Kerala Soil Museum
Arid Forest Research Institute
 Indian Council of Forestry Research and Education
 Van Vigyan Kendra (VVK) Forest Science Centres
 Kerala Agricultural University

References

External links

 Official site

State agencies of Kerala
Indian forest research institutes
Research institutes in Kerala
Education in Thrissur
Indian Council of Forestry Research and Education
Organisations based in Thrissur
Science and technology in Thrissur
1975 establishments in Kerala
Research institutes established in 1975